The 1996 ITC Hockenheim-1 round was the first round of the 1996 International Touring Car Championship season. It took place on 14 April at the Hockenheimring.

Manuel Reuter won the first race, starting from fourth position, driving an Opel Calibra V6 4x4, and Jan Magnussen gained the second one, driving a Mercedes C-Class.

Classification

Qualifying

Race 1

Race 2

Standings after the event

Drivers' Championship standings

Manufacturers' Championship standings

 Note: Only the top five positions are included for both sets of drivers' standings.

References

External links
Deutsche Tourenwagen Masters official website

1996 International Touring Car Championship season